Ethminolia impressa is a species of sea snail, a marine gastropod mollusk in the family Trochidae, the top snails.

Distribution
This marine species occurs off New Caledonia.

References

 Payri & Richer de Forges (2007), Compendium of Marine Species of New Caledonia; Document Scientifiques et Techniques II 7 volume special

External links
 To World Register of Marine Species

impressa
Gastropods described in 1869